2010 Copa FGF, also known as Copa Enio Costamilan, is the 7th edition of Copa FGF. 18 team participated in the tournament.

The winner would be qualified for 2010 Recopa Sul-Brasileira and 2011 Campeonato Brasileiro Série D. However, the winner may already qualified for the higher division or withdraw to play. Moreover, If 2011 Campeonato Gaúcho winner and runner-up were Grêmio and Internacional (GRE–NAL), the runner-up of the cup would be allocated 1 of the 3 spot of the state to 2012 Copa do Brasil, otherwise the champion, runner-up and the third place of the league would be qualified to the cup.

Format
The clubs were divided into three groups according to their location (Metropolitan, Border and Mountain), and would be play 10 matches in double round-robin in each group. 16 teams would qualify for the next stage, which the group winner would be paired with fifth place; runner-up paired with fourth place. The best third place would against the best sixth place and the two other against each other.

Teams of lower rank plays their home match first and the opponent of the next stage would be paired based upon bracket.

Participating teams
Teams filled their inferior squad to the tournament: Internacional used its B team, Porto Alegre fielded its youth products along with other contracted players and Grêmio used its B team (under-20 team).

Campeonato Gaúcho
 Caxias do Sul (Caxias do Sul)
 Grêmio (Porto Alegre)
 Internacional (Porto Alegre)
 Novo Hamburgo (Novo Hamburgo)
 Pelotas (Pelotas)
 Porto Alegre (Porto Alegre)
 São José (Porto Alegre)

Segunda Divisão
 14 de Julho (Santana do Livramento)
 Bagé (Bagé)
 Carazinho (Carazinho)
 Cerâmica (Gravataí)
 Cruzeiro (Porto Alegre)
 Guarany (Bagé)
 Guarany (Camaquã)
 Juventus (Santa Rosa)
 Lajeadense (Lajeado)
 Riopardense (Rio Pardo)
 Sapucaiense (Sapucaia do Sul)

Group stage

Group 1 – Metropolitan

Group 2 – Highlands

Group 3 – Frontier Region

Knockout stage

Bracket

Note: Order of legs reversed except starred (*)

Round of 16

First leg

Second leg

Quarterfinals

First leg

Second leg

Semifinals

First leg

Second leg

Final

First leg

Second leg

References

External links
Federação Gaúcha de Futebol 

Copa FGF
Copa Fgf, 2010